Attorney General Schneider may refer to:

Curt T. Schneider (born 1943),  Attorney General of Kansas
William Schneider (politician) (born 1959), Attorney General of Maine

See also
General Schneider (disambiguation)